One South at The Plaza (formerly the Bank of America Plaza) is a , 40-story skyscraper in Charlotte, North Carolina. It is the 7th tallest in the city. On the ground floor is the Overstreet Mall, which connects to neighboring buildings via skybridges; located below-grade is the parking garage with space for 456 vehicles and leases a nearby five-level garage, providing 730 additional parking spaces.

History 
The building site was sold in 3 transactions.  The Redevelopment Commission, the prior owner of the 3-acre building site, in March 1971 agreed to sell it to Independence Square Associates in multiple transactions for a total of $1 million.  Independence Square Associates was a joint venture between North Carolina National Bank and Crow, Carter, and Associates.  The first parcel was 1-acre and it was sold to ISA in August 1972.  The second parcel was sold to ISA in late 1972.  The final parcels were sold in May 1973.  The site was originally between the business of the S.H. Kress & CO building, Simpson Photo Service, and a Belk department store occupied a portion of the block the building was being built on. The construction cost was $40 million.  North Carolina National Bank took out a $28 million loan from Metropolitan Life Insurance Company to cover construction costs for the tower and a 6-story 650 space parking structure.

The tower was 1 of 3 buildings under construction or newly finished in Uptown at that time. These 3 also included the new Wachovia building and Southern National Center, the 3 added totaled  of office space. At this point in Charlotte history, it was the biggest office building boom. However, developers were optimist that the new supply would be quickly occupied. Don Browning, general manager of Independence Square Associates stated this about his optimism about the market's ability to fill the office space in the building prior to its opening "If it continues the way it's been going, it will be more than 100 percent leased".
 
As predicted the building saw a lot of leases signed prior to opening. In December 1973 it was announced that the plaza of the building would have a 5 ton sculpture from Italy that was a rotating cast bronze disc 15 feet in diameter called "Il Grande Disco" is located in the plaza adjacent to the building. The sculpture was part of the plaza between the hotel and tower which included granite pavers, with trees and shrubbery throughout the plaza. The sculpture was created by Italian sculpture Arnaldo Pomodoro. In 1973 it was worth $400,000. In January 1974 another tenant announced they were leasing space ahead of the March 1974 building open. The company relocated their corporate headquarters from Georgetown, South Carolina to occupy space on the 37th, 38th, and 39th floors.    

The building opened in March 1974 as NCNB Plaza, it served as the world headquarters for NCNB and its successor, NationsBank, until the opening of NationsBank Corporate Center in 1992. NCNB moved in over a 3-month period.  It was the tallest building in North Carolina from its completion in 1974 until it was surpassed by One First Union Center in 1987.   The tower is located at the intersection of East Trade Street and South Tryon Street. 

In May 1974 Midrex, a steel maker based out of Toledo, Ohio, announced it was leasing the 40th floor in the building.  Midrex was a subsidiary of Korf Industries formed in 1974 Also, in May 1974 Midrex posting an ad in the Charlotte Observer to recruit 225 people for engineering, design, and accounting jobs in Charlotte.

The building has been renamed several times due to bank mergers.  In January 1992 the building was renamed NationsBank Plaza after the completion of the C&S/Sovran Corp merger.  In February 1999 as part of the Bank of America merger the building was renamed Bank of America Plaza and it maintained this named until it was renamed in 2019.

NCNB Plaza was built along with the 350-room Radisson Plaza. In 1998, LaSalle Advisors of Chicago owned NationsBank Plaza and the Radisson Plaza when Omni Hotels, which exited Charlotte two years earlier, bought the hotel with plans for an $8 million renovation, making it a Four Diamond luxury hotel.

At the time of their renewal their space in the building was larger than the  they occupied in their Bank of America Corporate Center directly across the street. In November 2006 Behringer Harvard purchased the building for $194.1 million. It was Charlotte's 5th largest tower.

In November 2010 it was announced that Bank of America would be reducing their leased space in the building by  due to moving their move to recently completed 1 Bank of America Center.  Bank of America plans to occupy 95% of the  available space in 1 Bank of America Center. At the time of the space reduction Bank of America was still the largest tenant in the building occupying .

The firm has occupied the building since 2001 when they moved from their office on Morehead Street. At the time of the renewal, they had 107 local employees.

In September 2015 it was announced that the restaurant Essex will open a  ground floor location by the end of the year.  The location was formerly home Merrill Lynch's uptown offices and will extensive renovations.  The space will open onto the plaza with outdoor seating covered in glass, the construction will require the existing fountain to be covered. 

In May 2016 the building's owner, TIER REIT, announced $20 million will be invested for renovations to add more street level retail. The renovations should be complete by May 2017. The building's previous bank branch now vacate, along with vacate office space, and part of the lobby will be combined to add street retail. The idea is to energize the corner at occupies at Trade St and Tryon St and enhance nightlife.

In November 2016 McNair Law Firm announced it will move into  in the building.  The move will provide the firm with more flexible and collaborative space.  They were previously located at 301 South Tryon.  

In December 2017 Consolidated Claims Group relocated its headquarters from South Park to the building, occupying  of space.  The move will allow the company to continue to grow its headcount.  At the time of the move CCG had 60 employees.  

In March 2019 Cousin's Properties Inc. became the building's new owner with their purchase of TIER REIT. In Charlotte Cousin's has become an important landlord through numerous acquisitions.  
  
In January 2021 the building was renamed One South at The Plaza after Bank of America exit at the end of 2020.  Their departure left .  The space available is across floors 3 to 19.  Cousin's, the building's owner, with the new name announcement also announced that the building will be ongoing a $10 million renovation.  This will include corridor updates, elevator lobby renovations, changing the building signage, and updating the floors Bank of America occupied.

In July 2021 Cousins Properties sold the building to Tourmaline Capital Partners and Monarch Alternative Capital for $271.5 million. When the sale was final the tower was 58% leased.

In February 2022 it was announced that law firm Alston & Bird would be relocating from the building to Vantage South End East Tower, occupying  in the new building.  At the time of relocation the firm had 200 local employees and occupied  in the building.  The East Tower is expected to deliver in May and has around of its  preleased.

In December 2022 Tourmaline Capital Partners completed a $7 million renovation of the building.  The renovation focused on the creation of a third floor  tenant amenity space.  This new space includes new furniture, a full-service café with a barista, concierge service, on-site IT consultants, a work lounge with windows overlooking Trade and Tryon, a soundproof recording and podcast studio, and a virtual golf simulator. Jeff Fronek, Tourmaline managing principal, said this about the renovations "The third floor is the first phase of where we’re delivering on the promise of providing enhanced capabilities ... It's a space that feels good to be in," he said. "We knew through tracking the market, what it could be and thought we could play a constructive role in what the next chapter of this building and uptown could look like."  As December 2022 the building is 53% occupied.

See also
List of tallest buildings in Charlotte
List of tallest buildings in North Carolina

References

External links

Emporis
42Floors
Allbusiness
Skyscraperpage

Office buildings completed in 1974
Bank buildings in North Carolina
Skyscraper office buildings in Charlotte, North Carolina
Skyscrapers in Charlotte, North Carolina